The 2022–23 Eastern Kentucky Colonels men's basketball team represented Eastern Kentucky University in the 2022–23 NCAA Division I men's basketball season. The Colonels, led by fifth-year head coach A. W. Hamilton, played their home games at Baptist Health Arena in Richmond, Kentucky as members of the ASUN Conference.

Previous season
The Colonels finished the 2021–22 season 13–18, 5–11 in ASUN play to finish in fifth place in the West Division. In the ASUN tournament, they were defeated by Kennesaw State in the first round.

Roster

Schedule and results

|-
!colspan=12 style=| Non-conference regular season

|-
!colspan=9 style=| ASUN regular season

|-
!colspan=12 style=| ASUN tournament

|-
!colspan=12 style=| College Basketball Invitational

Sources

References

Eastern Kentucky Colonels men's basketball seasons
Eastern Kentucky Colonels
Eastern Kentucky Colonels men's basketball
Eastern Kentucky Colonels men's basketball
Eastern Kentucky